Muan Bang clan was one of the Korean clans. Their Bon-gwan was in Muan County, South Jeolla Province. According to the research in 2000, the number of Muan Bang clan was 331. Their founder was  who was from Shanxi and was a loyal of Zhu Yujian in Southern Ming, China.

See also 
 Korean clan names of foreign origin

References

External links 
 

 
Korean clan names of Chinese origin